Eva Aeppli (2 May 1925 – 4 May 2015) was a Swiss artist.

Personal life
Born on 2 May 1925 in  Zofingen, Switzerland, Aeppli spent her childhood in Basel where she attended the School of Decorative Arts.  Her father was a Waldorf educator and child development author, Willi Aeppli, who worked with Rudolf Steiner.

She moved to France in 1952 with her second husband, the sculptor Jean Tinguely. Subsequently, she began her artistic career as a painter in Paris. From 1954 to 1960 Aeppli and Tinguely shared a living and working space, at the Impasse Ronsin, opposite Constantin Brâncuși's which had been there since 1916. They belonged to the Parisian avantgarde with other artists Daniel Spoerri, Yves Klein and Niki de Saint-Phalle.  Eva Aeppli became interested in sculpting figurines in textile and in bronze.

In 1975, she discovered astrology thanks to Jacques Berthon and the painter Eric Leraille. Fifteen years later, she decided to combat poverty, oppression and ignorance by creating the Myrrahkir Foundation.  Aeppli lived until the age of 90. Aeppli died on 4 May 2015 in Honfleur, France.

Aeppli's first child, with architect Hans Leu, was Felix Leu (1945). Her grandchildren are therapist Jane Leu Rekas, tattooist Filip Leu, former model Ama Leu, artist Aia Leu and musician Ajja Leu.  Aeppli's daughter with Jean Tinguely is painter Miriam Tinguely.

References

External links

 Eva Aeppli on AWARE: Archives of Women Artists, Research and Exhibitions

1925 births
2015 deaths
Swiss women painters
People from Zofingen
Swiss women sculptors
20th-century Swiss painters
20th-century Swiss sculptors
21st-century Swiss sculptors
20th-century Swiss women artists
21st-century Swiss women artists
21st-century Swiss painters